Naisiai Manor is a former residential manor in Naisiai village, Šiauliai District Municipality, Lithuania.

References

Manor houses in Lithuania
Šiauliai County